Nanette M. "Nan" DeRenzi is a former United States Navy officer. She served as the 42nd Judge Advocate General (JAG) of the United States Navy. She assumed that position on July 20, 2012 and held it until her retirement on June 26, 2015. Prior to that, she served as Deputy Judge Advocate General of the Navy (DJAG) from August 2009 to July 2012.

Early life and education
DeRenzi was born in Philadelphia and raised in Pennsauken, New Jersey. She attended Camden Catholic High School and graduated magna cum laude from Villanova University in 1983. She was commissioned through the JAG Corps Student Program and, in 1986, graduated from the Temple University School of Law. She later earned a Master of Laws degree (Environmental Law) from the George Washington University School of Law.

Career
DeRenzi began her career as a litigator, first as a defense counsel and later as a trial counsel (prosecution) in Newport, Rhode Island, followed by assignments in appellate defense and civil litigation in Washington, DC.  DeRenzi also served as the fleet judge advocate to commander, U.S. 7th and 3rd Fleets, as well as staff judge advocate to commander, Carrier Group 7.  Before her appointment to flag rank, she served as the senior staff judge advocate for commander, U.S. Southern Command; special assistant for legal and legislative matters to the secretary of the Navy; legislative counsel for environmental programs in the Navy Office of Legislative Affairs; and executive assistant to the JAG.  In command, she served as commanding officer, Naval Legal Service Office, North Central.

Awards and education
DeRenzi's personal decorations include the Navy Distinguished Service Medal, the Defense Superior Service Medal, the Legion of Merit (four awards), the Meritorious Service Medal (four awards) and the Navy Achievement Medal (two awards).

References

External links

United States Navy vice admirals
Recipients of the Legion of Merit
Living people
Temple University Beasley School of Law alumni
Year of birth missing (living people)
Recipients of the Defense Superior Service Medal
People from Pennsauken Township, New Jersey
Female admirals of the United States Navy
Villanova University alumni
George Washington University Law School alumni
Recipients of the Meritorious Service Medal (United States)